KRI Teluk Mentawai (959) is a dry cargo support ship of the Indonesian Navy.

Development and design 
KRI Teluk Mentawai is a Hungarian Tisza-class coastal cargo ship (Project 1849), the design of which is based on the Soviet Keyla-class. The ship is powered by a MAN 5-cylinders diesel engine, with total power output of  distributed in one shaft.

The ship is a cargo coaster ship with a dead weight of 1,828 tonnes has the main task of being a logistics transport ship in its duties as a supporting element of military sea transportation. This ship has three spacious cargo holds and also equipped with six cranes for loading and unloading cargo.

She also able to transport 250 fully-equipped troops. The ship is armed with two 12.7 mm heavy machine guns in 2M-1 twin gun naval mounts, located on the port and starboard side of the ship. In addition, it is equipped with individual weapons in the form of the Soviet-made AK-47.

Construction and career 
Teluk Mentawai was built in 1964 by Angyalföld Unit of Hungarian Shipyard & Crane Factory in Budapest, Hungary. The vessel was commissioned on 1 September 1964.

The last repair was carried out in 2005 at the PT. Dok Kodja Bahari (DKB), Tanjung Priok, Jakarta. In the repair, her original engine has been replaced with a new Caterpillar engine made in the United States.

On 12 January 2021, she was deployed to recover and transport debris of Sriwijaya Air Flight 182. On 15 February, after Flight 182 recovery operation, she went into dry docking at the PT. Daya Radar Utama Shipyard, Lampung for routine maintenance.

Notes

References

 
 

Ships built in Hungary
1964 ships
Auxiliary ships of the Indonesian Navy